Union Centre is an unincorporated rural community in the Canadian province of Nova Scotia, located in Pictou County.

Navigator

References
Union Centre on Destination Nova Scotia

Communities in Pictou County
General Service Areas in Nova Scotia